Movie Star, Inc. is a New York City-based manufacturer, marketer and seller of lingerie, sleepwear and other types of clothing. Organized in 1935 and formerly known as Sanmark Stardust, Inc., the company became Movie Star, Inc. in 1992. It was acquired by Frederick's of Hollywood in 2006, who sold the company to Dolce Vita Intimates in 2010.

References

External links
moviestarinc.com

Companies based in New York City
Clothing manufacturers